The Dodge GTX is a muscle car manufactured by Chrysler-Fevre Argentina S.A. under the Dodge brand. It was a development made on the basis of the 1960/66 platform A (Early A-Body), consisting of a coupe without studs (hardtop) with a sporty cut, muscular, aggressive, aerodynamic and high-performance design. Due to its design, it was listed as one of the few muscle cars made in Argentina.

This car was presented in October 1970, as a replacement for the Dodge GT model from the sedan range of the car line. As well as being the cornerstone that gave rise to the coupe range of this line of cars, from which the coupe version of the Polara and its evolved R/T version would later emerge.

It was originally featured equipped with an inline 6-cylinder Slant-Power A-119 engine, which was originally used in the Dodge GT sedan, mated to a 4-speed manual gearbox. Later this engine would be supplanted by a 318 cubic inch V8, which would end up becoming distinctive for this model, until the end of its production in 1979.

Its design and development was also the object of attention for its foray into the sports face, being used by several competitors for its participation in the Turismo Carretera category, where it exercised a wide domain during the 1980s, obtaining 8 out of 10 championships. Its mechanical reliability, added to its aerodynamic design, would make it the representative car of the Dodge brand in this category and in the different zones of Argentina. Likewise, this model would also serve as the basis for the development of the Dodge Cherokee racing prototype, presented in the mid-90s, which in addition to combining the design lines of the GTX with an AMC XJ "Cherokee" engine, received the homologation of the Asociación Corredores de Turismo Carretera, as a representative car of the brand.

History

Antecedent

In 1968, Chrysler-Fevre Argentina S.A. had launched a new line of sedans, all of them based on the same exclusive body design for the Argentine market, which was a development based on the third generation North American Dart (63/66) or the Valiant already sold in Argentina previously. In the first place and for a short period of time the Dodge Valiant would be launched, it was a basic sedan with little equipment, in some cases they even lacked radio, they also sported 13" steel wheels with hubcap, soon after it was discontinued to fill the range with three well distinguished models, first the Taxi version, then the Polara with a little more equipment and an improved interior to end the Dodge line with a more luxurious model named "Coronado", from this last model the Dodge came off the GT, a luxury sedan developed with sporty performance, this model was equipped with a 3687cm3 (225 cubic inch) Chrysler Slant-Power A-119 engine, with a compression ratio of 8.4: 1 (the highest in the range) and capable of delivering 155HP (SAE) at 4500rpm. All this, coupled to a 4-speed manual A-833 of American origin.

Although the reception of this vehicle was good by the public (mainly thanks to its high performance and the combination of its attributes as a luxury car), Chrysler-Fevre would seek a way to offer a new product with a more sporty image, taking into account that the models of the sedan line (Polara and Coronado), began to be seen more as luxurious cars than sports cars. For this reason, Chrysler-Fevre would carry out a marketing study that, finally, found that purely sports car captured the attention of its customers.

References

External links
South County Autos

GTX
Cars introduced in 1970
Cars of Argentina
Turismo Carretera
Muscle cars
Cars discontinued in 1979